The Tahiti national under-17 football team is the national U-17 team of Tahiti and is controlled by the Tahitian Football Federation. They currently compete in the Tahiti First Division.

Competition Record

FIFA U-17 World Cup record

OFC U-17 Championship record
The OFC U-17 Championship is a tournament held once every two years to decide the only two qualification spots for the Oceania Football Confederation (OFC) and its representatives at the FIFA U-17 World Cup.

Current squad
The following players were called up for the 2018 OFC U-16 Championship from 9 to 22 September 2018.

Caps and goals as of 22 September 2018 after the game against Fiji.

2017 squad
The following players were called up for the 2017 OFC U-17 Championship from 11 to 24 February 2017.

Caps and goals as of 17 February 2017 after the game against Papua New Guinea.

Recent call-ups

|-

! colspan="9"  style="background:#b0d3fb; text-align:left;"|
|- style="background:#dfedfd;"

|-

! colspan="9"  style="background:#b0d3fb; text-align:left;"|
|- style="background:#dfedfd;"

|-
! colspan="9"  style="background:#b0d3fb; text-align:left;"|
|- style="background:#dfedfd;"

2011 squad

Caps and goals as of 20 January 2011.

|-

! colspan="9"  style="background:#b0d3fb; text-align:left;"|
|- style="background:#dfedfd;"

|-

! colspan="9"  style="background:#b0d3fb; text-align:left;"|
|- style="background:#dfedfd;"

|-
! colspan="9"  style="background:#b0d3fb; text-align:left;"|
|- style="background:#dfedfd;"

Fixtures & Results

2018

External links
Tahiti Football Federation official website

under-17
Oceanian national under-17 association football teams